The Tallahassee Female Academy (also known as the Leon Female Academy) was one of the predecessor institutions of Florida State University in Tallahassee, Florida. The school started in 1843 as the Misses Bates School and was perhaps the most stable educational institution in Tallahassee until the West Florida Seminary officially began operations in 1857. They were remedies for the fact that at the time there were no public high schools in Florida. Male and female students studied separately.

A group of Tallahassee citizens organized as a Board of Trustees for the Academy conducted operations until the school was absorbed by the West Florida Seminary in 1858.  The school offered an unusually complete education for the time.

Notes and references

 
Education in Tallahassee, Florida
Educational institutions established in 1843
Female seminaries in the United States
1843 establishments in Florida Territory
Educational institutions disestablished in 1858
1858 disestablishments in Florida
Public universities and colleges in Florida
Defunct universities and colleges in Florida